The 2003 Sedgemoor District Council election took place on 1 May 2003 to elect members of Sedgemoor District Council in Somerset, England. The whole council was up for election and the Conservative Party stayed in overall control of the council.

Election result

|}

Two Labour and one Conservative candidates were unopposed.

Ward results

References

2003 English local elections
2003
2000s in Somerset